Turkish Airlines flies to 52 domestic and 263 international destinations in 124 countries, excluding those only served by Turkish Airlines Cargo. Following is a list of destinations Turkish Airlines and Turkish Airlines Cargo fly to as part of scheduled services, . The list includes the city, country, and the airport name, with the airline hub, focus airports, cargo services, future and terminated destinations marked.

The continents with most destinations outside Turkey are Europe with 109 (including Transcaucasia, Cyprus and Siberia), Asia with 76, Africa with 55 (including Sinai Peninsula) and the Americas with 23. Outside Turkey, the countries with the largest number of airports served by the carrier are Russia with 17; Germany with 13; the United States with 12; Italy with 10; France with 8; Saudi Arabia with 7; Iran, Iraq and the United Kingdom with 6; Egypt, Kazakhstan, Spain and Uzbekistan with 5 each.

Destinations

References

Annotations

External links

 

Turkish Airlines
Lists of airline destinations
Turkey transport-related lists
Star Alliance destinations